Charlemagne Tower Jr. (April 17, 1848February 24, 1923) was an American businessman, scholar, and diplomat.

Biography
Charlemagne Tower was born in Philadelphia, Pennsylvania, on April 17, 1848 to Charlemagne Tower Sr. and Amelia Malvina (Bartle) Tower. He was the first of seven children and his sister, Henrietta, was the last.

He spent his childhood in Orwigsburg and Pottsville, Pennsylvania. In 1862 he entered a military academy in New Haven, Connecticut and transferred in 1865 to Phillips Exeter Academy in Exeter, New Hampshire. Tower entered Harvard University in 1868 and graduated in 1872.

After graduating from Harvard, Tower returned to Europe where he lived and traveled for four years. Tower studied history, languages and literature. Initially he lived in the cities of Madrid, Paris and Tours. In 1874 he traveled to Germany and later to Denmark, Sweden, Russia, and Greece.

In July 1876 Tower returned to the United States and was admitted to the bar in 1878, later doing business in the mining and railroad sectors. He moved to Duluth, Minnesota in 1882 when he began serving as president of the Duluth and Iron Range Railroad. In 1887 he returned to Philadelphia.

In 1891 he began to devote himself exclusively to history and archaeology, and became a professor in the University of Pennsylvania. He served as Minister to Austria-Hungary (1897–1899) for President William McKinley before being transferred to Russia as Ambassador (1899–1902). Following his post in St. Petersburg, he served as Ambassador to Germany from December 1902 to June 1908 under President Theodore Roosevelt. He was a trustee of the University of Pennsylvania, donating a large collection of 2,300 Russian books to the library, which forms the nucleus of Penn's Russian and East European collection.

Death
In 1923 Tower and his wife were living in the Green Hill Farms Hotel in Overbrook, outside of Philadelphia. On February 9, 1923 he entered the Pennsylvania Hospital in Philadelphia. Charlemagne Tower Jr. died February 24, 1923. The cause of death was pneumonia. He was buried in Waterville Cemetery in Waterville, NY.

Works
 (French translation)
Diary of a European Trip. Princeton University. (Diary written by Tower when he was an attaché to the American Legation in Madrid, dated 1872-1873).

Further reading

Brunet, Helen Tower. Nellie and Charlie: A Family Memoir of the Gilded Age. New York: iUniverse, 2005. 
Historical Society of Pennsylvania. "Proceedings at the dinner given by the Historical society of Pennsylvania to Hon. Charlemagne Tower, envoy extraordinary and minister plenipotentiary to Austria-Hungary. April twenty-ninth, 1897." Philadelphia: E. Stern & Co. 1897.

References

This article integrates text in the public domain taken from the following two sources:

1848 births
1923 deaths
Ambassadors of the United States to Austria
Ambassadors of the United States to Germany
Ambassadors of the United States to Russia
Harvard University alumni
Businesspeople from Philadelphia
Deaths from pneumonia in Pennsylvania
Burials in New York (state)
19th-century American diplomats
20th-century American diplomats